is a bilingual Japanese digital manga series. An anime television series based on the manga began airing in April 2015, and a second season, titled , began airing in October 2015. A third season, titled , began airing in October 2016. A fourth season, titled Rainy Cocoa Amecon!!, began airing in October 2017. A fifth season, titled Rainy Cocoa side G, began airing in January 2019.

Characters

Media

Manga
The manga is available in both Japanese and English, and allows the reader to switch between the two languages for both text and audio. According to the creators, the manga's app has been downloaded from the iTunes Store and Google Play in over 50 countries.

Anime
An anime television adaptation was announced in December 2014. The series is directed by Tomomi Mochizuki, Atsuko Takahashi provides the character designs, and Kaoru Kondou is composing the series' music. The series' theme song, "Rainy Cocoa", is performed by Hiro Shimono. The series began airing on 5 April 2015, and was simulcast in North America by Funimation.

A second season was announced in June 2015, titled . Also announced was a crowdfunding campaign to raise 2 million yen to add more characters and cast members. It premiered on 4 October 2015 on Tokyo MX and Sun TV. It was accompanied by a live-action segment. The second season was also streamed by Funimation.

A third season was announced in April 2016, titled . It premiered on 2 October 2016 on Sun TV and Tokyo MX.

A fourth season was announced in August 2017, titled Rainy Cocoa Amecon!! It premiered on 4 October 2017 on Sun TV and Tokyo MX.

A fifth season was announced in April 2018, titled Rainy Cocoa side G. It premiered on 8 January 2019 on Tokyo MX and Sun TV. Unlike previous seasons, this season has an all-female cast.

Episode list

Rainy Cocoa

Rainy Cocoa, Welcome to Rainy Color

Rainy Cocoa in Hawaii

Rainy Cocoa Amecon!!

Rainy Cocoa side G

References

External links
  
  
 

2015 anime television series debuts
2016 anime television series debuts
2017 anime television series debuts
2019 anime television series debuts
EMT Squared
Funimation
Tokyo MX original programming